Alai Osai is a 1985 Indian Tamil language  film directed by Sirumugai Ravi. The film stars Vijayakanth and Nalini. It was given an A (restricted to adults) certificate by the censor board without any cuts. The film was released on 14 January 1985.

Plot

Cast 
Vijayakanth
Nalini
Madhuri
Goundamani
Radha Ravi
Sangili Murugan
Senthil
Idichapuli Selvaraj
Loose Mohan
Gandhimathi
Anuradha

Soundtrack 
Soundtrack was composed by Ilaiyaraaja. The lyrics for the songs were written by Ilayabharathi, Gangai Amaran, Muthulingam, Kamakodian and Vairamuthu. The song "Poradada" became an anthem for Dalits, and was reused in two Tamil films directed by Mari Selvaraj: Pariyerum Perumal (2018) and Karnan (2021).

Reception
Jayamanmadhan of Kalki wrote many of the artistes were wasted for 16 reels and felt Ilaiyaraaja had used tunes which could be considered worthless for other films. He concluded the review saying those who go to the beach and listen to the waves for three hours are wise.

References

External links 
 

1980 films
1980s Tamil-language films
1985 films
Films scored by Ilaiyaraaja